I Love the '70s is a decade nostalgia television mini-series and the second installment of the I Love the... series produced by VH1. The series is based on a BBC series of the same name. It examines the pop culture of the 1970s, using footage from the era, along with "Where Are They Now?" interviews with celebrities from the decade. Additionally, the show features comedians poking fun at the kitschiness of what was popular. The first episode of the series, I Love 1970, premiered on August 18, and concluded with the final episode of the series, I Love 1979, on August 22, 2003. A sequel, I Love the '70s: Volume 2, appeared in the United States on VH1 beginning on July 10, 2006.

Commentators

Aerosmith (Joe Perry and Tom Hamilton)
Art Alexakis
Flex Alexander
John Amos
Loni Anderson
Tom Arnold
Sebastian Bach
Bob Balaban
Alec Baldwin
Jillian Barberie
Bob Barker
Garcelle Beauvais-Nilon
Bella the Chimp
Fred "Rerun" Berry
Lewis Black
Michael Ian Black
Linda Blair
Todd Bridges
Andrew Bryniarski
Robin Byrd
Nancy Carell
Lynda Carter
David Cassidy
Charlie's Angels (Lucy Liu, Drew Barrymore and Cameron Diaz)
Ellen Cleghorne
Eric Close
Didi Conn
Jeff Corwin
Molly Culver
Bo Derek
Simon Doonan
Bill Dwyer
Rich Eisen
Joe Elliott
Erik Estrada
Dannah Feinglass
Miguel Ferrer
Lou Ferrigno
Greg Fitzsimmons
Dave Foley
Jorja Fox
Kim France
Doug E. Fresh
Jim Gaffigan
Gina Garan
Leif Garrett
Kyle Gass
Peri Gilpin
Stacey Grenrock-Woods
Annabelle Gurwitch
Luis Guzman
Sammy Hagar
Gunnar Hansen
Rachael Harris
Tony Hawk
Isaac Hayes
Hugh Hefner
Leslie Hope
Mark Hoppus
Scott Ian
Rick James
Ron Jeremy
Randy Jones
Kermit the Frog
Brian Krause
Nick Lachey
Lisa Lampanelli
David L. Lander
Carol Leifer
Donal Logue
George Lopez
Loni Love
Stephen Lynch
Justina Machado
Michael Madsen
Marilyn Manson
Constance Marie
Cheech Marin
Ziggy Marley
Benito Martinez
Matchbox Twenty (Paul Doucette and Rob Thomas)
Edwin McCain
Darryl McDaniels
Kevin McDonald
McG
Mark McKinney
Bret Michaels
Leon Mobley
Colin Mochrie
Pat Monahan
Demi Moore
Jason Mraz
Sharon Osbourne
Ron Palillo
Penn & Teller
Liz Phair
Lisa Marie Presley
Megyn Price
Greg Proops
Rachel Quaintance
Lionel Richie
Mo Rocca
Nile Rodgers
The Roots (Black Thought and ?uestlove)
Tracee Ellis Ross
David Lee Roth
Kelly Rowland
Jill Scott
Stuart Scott
Robert Shields
Pauly Shore
Mitch Silpa
Grace Slick
Kurtwood Smith
Dee Snider
Kevin Sorbo
Hal Sparks
Joel Stein
Fisher Stevens
Stiller and Meara
Jeff Stilson
Treach
Uncle Kracker
Brian Unger
Vinnie
David Wain
George Wallace
Steven Weber
Kevin Weisman
Maggie Wheeler
Victor Williams
Nancy and Ann Wilson
Dean Winters
Bernadette Yao
Rob Zombie

Recurring segments 
 Roller Rink Anthem: Leif Garrett presents one of the big hits of the year in question.
 Foxy Ladies: Erik Estrada presents the hottest women of the year.
 Macho Men: Bo Derek presents the hottest men of the year.
 Commercial: A famous television ad is shown from the 1970s.
 Wonders: Lynda Carter presents various products and inventions that were introduced in the given year.
 Follicle Fads: Isaac Hayes presents what the hottest hairstyle was for the year, sometimes choosing more than one.
 Bella Says: Bella the Chimp picks a primate of the year (with subtitles).
 During the credits of every episode, a popular song from each year was played while footage of Bella the Chimp playing with 1970s toys was shown. These were usually replaced with a show promo by Vh1.
 On every episode, Kermit the Frog does a parody of the "brought to you by" segments of Sesame Street by saying "I Love the '70s is brought to you by the letter V, the letter H, and the number 1.".

Topics covered by year

1970 
 The Jackson 5
 Weebles 
 Sesame Street (originally premiered in 1969)
 The Partridge Family 
 Hee Haw (originally premiered in 1969)
 The Carol Burnett Show (originally premiered in 1967)
 Love, American Style (originally premiered in 1969)
 Wife swapping
 Waterbed
 The Newlywed Game (originally premiered in 1966)
 The Mod Squad (originally premiered in 1968)
 The Odd Couple
 Elvis meets Nixon
 Black Sabbath
 Easy Listening Music (specifically The Carpenters and Bread)
 Monday Night Football
 Love Story
 Neil Diamond
 The Beatles' breakup
 Wild Kingdom (originally premiered in 1963)
 Lite-Brite 
 Mister Rogers' Neighborhood (originally premiered in 1968)
 Are You There God? It's Me, Margaret. by Judy Blume
 The Brady Bunch (originally premiered in 1969)

Roller Rink Anthem of 1970: "American Woman" by The Guess Who

Foxy Ladies of 1970: Goldie Hawn, Elizabeth Montgomery and Jane Fonda

Macho Men of 1970: Jack Lord, Frank Gifford and James Brolin

Flashback Commercial of 1970: 9Lives

Wonders of 1970: The first floppy disk, the computer mouse and the pocket calculator

Follicle Fad of 1970: Butt-length hair

Primate of 1970: Lancelot Link

1971 
Shaft
The Electric Company
Tom Jones
Keep America Beautiful
Hogan's Heroes (originally premiered in 1965)
Fiddler On The Roof
"Stairway to Heaven" by Led Zeppelin
Ouija
Soul Train
All in the Family
Kareem Abdul-Jabbar
Hot pants
Operation 
"Joy To The World" by Three Dog Night
H.R. Pufnstuf (originally premiered in 1969)
Dirty Harry
Ford Pinto
Bell-bottoms
Coca-Cola's "I'd Like to Teach the World to Sing" commercials
Willy Wonka & the Chocolate Factory

Roller Rink Anthem of 1971: "American Pie" by Don McLean

Foxy Ladies of 1971: Tina Turner, Candice Bergen and Jill St. John

Macho Men of 1971: Sean Connery, Rod Stewart and James Brown

Flashback Commercial of 1971: Charmin

Wonders of 1971: Hamburger Helper, Egg McMuffin and Starbucks coffee

Follicle Fad of 1971: He-Man or Jesus hair

Primate of 1971: Raffles

1972 
Kung Fu and Bruce Lee
Scooby-Doo, Where Are You! (originally premiered in 1969)
Stevie Wonder
The Godfather
Fat Albert and the Cosby Kids
Afro
Ben
Lunch boxes and Wonder Bread
Deep Throat
The Poseidon Adventure
Sea Monkeys
Mark Spitz
Gaucho pants
The Bermuda Triangle
Josie and the Pussycats (originally premiered in 1970) and Josie and the Pussycats in Outer Space
Ziggy Stardust
"I Am Woman" by Helen Reddy and the Women's Liberation Movement
Blythe
John Lennon and Yoko Ono on The Mike Douglas Show
Deliverance
The Brady kids grow up and three-part Hawaii arc in The Brady Bunch'''s fourth season

Roller Rink Anthem of 1972: "Superfly" by Curtis Mayfield

Foxy Ladies of 1972: Barbi Benton, Nadia Comăneci and Gloria Steinem

Macho Men of 1972: Bob Griese, Steve McQueen and Bobby Fischer

Flashback Commercial of 1972: Chiffon Margarine (actually aired in 1979)

Wonders of 1972: Hacky-sack, frozen yogurt, White Zinfandel and Atkins diet

Follicle Fad of 1972: Women having unshaved armpits, legs and pubic regions

Primate of 1972: Caesar

 1973 
 Sanford and Son (originally premiered in 1972)
 A Charlie Brown Thanksgiving "Jungle Boogie" by Kool & the Gang
 Baby Alive
 The Waltons (originally premiered in 1972)
 Live and Let Die Leisure suit
 Charlotte's Web Pink Floyd's The Dark Side of the Moon album
 Shrinky Dinks
 The Dating Game (originally premiered in 1965)
 The Joy of Sex "Free Bird" by Lynyrd Skynyrd
 The Sonny & Cher Comedy Hour (originally premiered in 1971)
 Billie Jean King vs. Bobby Riggs ("Battle of the Sexes")
 Kojak Schoolhouse Rock Rollerderby and Kansas City Bomber Easy-Bake Oven
 ZOOM (originally premiered in 1972)
 The ExorcistRoller Rink Anthem of 1973: "Goodbye Yellow Brick Road" by Elton John

Foxy Ladies of 1973: Carly Simon, Gladys Knight and Carole & Paula

Macho Men of 1973: Paul Newman & Robert Redford, James Taylor and Roger Moore

Flashback Commercial of 1973: Fisher-Price Medical Kit

Wonders of 1973: Designated hitter, Krazy Glue, Cuisinart and disposable lighters

Follicle Fad of 1973: Baldness

Primate of 1973: Aldo

 1974 BenjiLittle House on the PrairieHong Kong Phooey"Sweet Home Alabama" by Lynyrd SkynyrdGood TimesConnect FourLet's Make a Deal (originally premiered in 1963)
Elton John
Day of the week panties
StreakingBlazing Saddles and Young FrankensteinMagic 8-Ball
Patty HearstThe Towering InfernoFoxy BrownThe Texas Chain Saw MassacreRumble in the Jungle
Slip 'N Slide 
"The Joker" by The Steve Miller Band (originally released in 1973)Death WishHappy DaysRoller Rink Anthem of 1974: "The Way We Were" by Barbra Streisand (originally released in 1973)

Foxy Ladies of 1974: Britt Ekland, Bebe Buell and Angie Dickinson

Macho Men of 1974: Eric Clapton, Mikhail Baryshnikov and Freddie Prinze

Flashback Commercial of 1974: Meow Mix

Wonders of 1974: Lite beer, People magazine, VCR and liposuction

Follicle Fad of 1974: Mutton chops

Primate of 1974: Magilla Gorilla

 1975 Welcome Back, KotterBig Wheel 
Earth, Wind & FireOne Day at a TimePet Rock
8 TrackLand of the Lost (originally premiered in 1974) The Life and Times of Grizzly Adams (originally released in 1974)
Pelé
Pong The Shazam!/Isis Hour (originally premiered in 1974)
"Love Will Keep Us Together" by Captain & TennilleBaretta"Feelings" by Morris Albert (originally released in 1974)The Secret Life of Plants (originally published in 1973)Saturday Night LiveErhard Seminars Training 
Squeaky Fromme and Sara Jane Moore try assassinating Gerald Ford
Barry Manilow
Metrication in the United States
Liberace
"Rhinestone Cowboy" by Glen Campbell
Mood ring
Tony Orlando and DawnMonty Python's Flying Circus (originally premiered in 1969) and Monty Python and the Holy GrailJawsRoller Rink Anthem of 1975: "That's The Way I Like It" by KC and the Sunshine Band

Foxy Ladies of 1975: Suzi Quatro, Chris Evert and Charo

Macho Men of 1975: Bruce Springsteen, Carlton Fisk and Joe Namath

Flashback Commercial of 1975: Band-Aid

Wonders of 1975: Kool-Aid, Freshen Up Gum, Famous Amos Cookies and NordicTrack

Follicle Fad of 1975: Grizzly Adams style

Primate of 1975: Cymbal monkey

 1976 Charlie's AngelsKissThe Muppet ShowCarrieThe Gong ShowFamily FeudDonny and MarieOscar MayerTaxi DriverStarsky and Hutch (originally premiered in 1975)
Dr. J
Bigfoot and Loch Ness Monster
"Do You Feel Like We Do" by Peter FramptonCar WashRockyStretch Armstrong
Captain KangarooThe Bad News BearsUnited States Bicentennial

Roller Rink Anthem of 1976: "December, 1963 (Oh, What a Night)" by The Four Seasons (originally released in 1975)

Foxy Ladies of 1976: Heart's Nancy & Ann Wilson, Jessica Lange and Lauren Hutton

Macho Men of 1976: Peter Frampton, Bob Marley and Jimmy Connors

Flashback Commercial of 1976: Wisk

Wonders of 1976: Perrier, I Love New York and United States Bicentennial

Follicle Fad of 1976: Dorothy Hamill style and Shag

Primate of 1976: King Kong

 1977 
 Wonder Woman 
 Battle of the Network Stars  ABBA
 Close Encounters of the Third Kind Star Wars What's Happening!! (originally premiered in 1976)
 "You Light Up My Life" by Debby Boone
 Shields and Yarnell
 Saturday Night Fever Studio 54
 Queen
 New York City (Son of Sam, New York City Blackout of 1977, and 1977 World Series)
 Smokey and the Bandit Annie Hall Clackers
 Punk rock (specifically the Ramones, the Sex Pistols, The Clash, and the New York Dolls)
 RootsRoller Rink Anthem of 1977: "Don't Leave Me This Way" by Thelma Houston (originally released in 1976)

Foxy Ladies of 1977: Cheryl Ladd, Stevie Nicks and Jacqueline Bisset

Macho Men of 1977: Lindsey Buckingham, Richard Gere and Arnold Schwarzenegger

Flashback Commercial of 1977: Miller Lite - "Great taste, less filling"

Wonders of 1977: Billy Beer, first MRI and sports bra

Follicle Fad of 1977: Chest hair and Mohawk

Primate of 1977: The Grape Ape

 1978 SupermanThe Incredible Hulk (originally premiered in 1977)Super Friends (originally premiered in 1973)HalloweenThe Price Is Right (originally premiered in 1972)
"Brick House" by Commodores (originally released in 1977)
Underalls Debbie Does DallasLouise Brown
Bee GeesGreaseWKRP in Cincinnati"Da Ya Think I'm Sexy?" by Rod StewartB.J. and the BearCB radiosUp In SmokeFantasy Island (originally premiered in 1977)
The Who and Led Zeppelin
SimonThe WizNational Lampoon's Animal HouseRoller Rink Anthem of 1978: "Le Freak" by Chic

Foxy Ladies of 1978: Margot Kidder, Raquel Welch and Cheryl Tiegs

Macho Men of 1978: Andy Gibb, Björn Borg and Mick Jagger

Flashback Commercial of 1978: Body on Tap shampoo

Wonders of 1978: Ben & Jerry's, Reese's Pieces, Ginsu and Ironman Triathlon

Follicle Fad of 1978: Throwback hair

Primate of 1978: Evie

 1979 
 CHiPs (originally premiered in 1977)
 The Warriors Pop Rocks 
 "I Will Survive" by Gloria Gaynor (originally released in 1978)
 Apocalypse Now Alien Slime 
 Taxi (originally premiered in 1978)
 Pittsburgh's back-to-back win in Super Bowl XIII and 1979 World Series
 10 Donna Summer
 Candie's shoes 
 Dallas Cowboys Cheerleaders
 Chippendale dancers
 Three's Company (originally premiered in 1977)
 The Jerk Jimmy Carter's Swamp Rabbit incident
 "My Sharona" by The Knack
 Captain Caveman and the Teen Angels (originally premiered in 1977)
 Village People
 The Muppet Movie''

Roller Rink Anthem of 1979: "We Are Family" by Sister Sledge

Foxy Ladies of 1979: Erin Gray, Bette Midler and Sally Field

Macho Men of 1979: Ted Nugent, Sting and Dudley Moore

Flashback Commercial of 1979: Coca-Cola (featuring Mean Joe)

Wonders of 1979: ESPN, tanning beds and Sunkist

Follicle Fad of 1979: Mustache

Primate of 1979: Monkey

References

External links 
 

Nostalgia television shows
Nostalgia television in the United States
VH1 original programming
2000s American television miniseries
2003 American television series debuts
2003 American television series endings